Selcuk may refer to:

 Selçuk (name)
 Seljuk (died c. 1038), leader of the Seljuk Turks
 Seljuq dynasty, the dynasty founded by Seljuk
 Seljuq Empire, the medieval empire founded and ruled by the dynasty
 Seljuq Sultanate of Rum, the medieval empire founded by later members of the dynasty
 Selçuk, a town in Turkey
 Selcuk (ship, 1921), a freighter, see Dalwarnic

See also 
 Selçuk (disambiguation)
 Seljuk (disambiguation)